Gro Holm (born 11 April 1958) is a Norwegian news editor and correspondent.

She was hired in the Norwegian Broadcasting Corporation in 1982. From 1994 to 1998, she served as their Moscow correspondent. She was later foreign affairs editor of the news division before being appointed as director of national and district news in 2005. She was let go in September 2008 after disagreeing with the leadership on a proposed organizational model. In 2013, she was appointed as the Norwegian Broadcasting Corporation's correspondent in Washington, D.C.

She was married to professor of political history, Trond Nordby, before marrying high-ranking diplomat Kai Eide. She has three daughters from her first marriage; her current husband had two earlier. The couple reside in Lommedalen.

References 

1958 births
Living people
NRK people
Norwegian television reporters and correspondents
Norwegian expatriates in Russia
Norwegian expatriates in the United States